Kenny Ridwan (born May 27, 1999) is an American actor known for his roles in the TV series The Goldbergs, The Thundermans, and The McCarthys. He has also appeared as a guest star on Perception, Bones, Modern Family, and House of Lies.

Early life
Ridwan was born in Bellevue, Washington, to a Chinese-American family. He is the third of five children. 

Ridwan first took up acting at the age of six or seven, following an advertisement for an acting school. He has become passionate about performing arts taking part in school theater productions. As a fifth-grader, he portrayed Belle's father, Maurice, in its Beauty and the Beast production. Before pursuing the craft professionally and landing his first audition, he participated in acting classes for two and a half years. 

Ridwan took advanced filmmaking in high school, and has shown interest in directing and producing. He graduated from Campbell Hall High School with honors.

Currently, Ridwan is enrolled at Columbia University for creative writing.

Career
Ridwan has been portraying the role of Dave Kim in ABC's sitcom The Goldbergs since March 2014. He also starred as Gideon in Nickelodeon's series The Thundermans.

Filmography

Film

Television

References

External links

Interview: Actor Kenny Ridwan, 'The Goldbergs' on Youtube.

1999 births
American male actors of Chinese descent
American male television actors
Living people
People from Bellevue, Washington